Love Letters is a young adult novel written by author Katie Fforde and was published by Arrow in 2009.

Plot summary

Laura Horsley is a 26-year-old young woman who works in a bookshop which is about to close. At the last author event that she organized, Eleanora who is a literary agent, becomes impressed with Laura’s work and offers her a job to help her niece organizing a literary festival. On the one hand, Laura is keen on the idea, but on the other hand she feels that she is not the right person for the job. Later on, her friends manage to convince her to attend at least the first meeting where Laura is given an interesting and almost impossible task-she has to convince her favorite writer, the Irish Dermot Flynn, who hasn’t written anything in years, to come to the literary festival. It is definitely a challenge to Laura, because Dermot now lives as a recluse and it is almost impossible to get in touch with him. The pressure is on, and Laura has not much time left to find Dermot and convince him so she immediately flies to Ireland with her new musician friend, Monica. They first meet him at Dermot’s literary evening in a pub. Laura finds him incredibly attractive but very temperamental at the same time. She starts falling in love with her favorite writer. They spend more and more time together and Dermot agrees to go to England for the festival. He even agrees to run a course at the University of Bath and asks Laura to help him selecting the 10 best writings. After the end of the course Dermot goes back to Ireland and Laura faces her feeling towards him. In the next few weeks she spends most of her time with organizing the festival but due to a misunderstanding Dermot refuses to go so Laura flies again to Ireland. She finds out that Dermot does not go to pubs anymore and lives as a recluse again. She goes to his house and saves the situation. Dermot attends the festival and it turns out really well. He manages to overcome writer’s block and he has a great success. Laura and Dermot spend some time away from each other again, but not much later Dermot visits Laura at her parents’ house to tell how much he loves her.

Characters

Laura Horsley: a shy 26-year-old young woman who loves books and she is in love with her favorite writer, Dermot Flynn.

Dermot Flynn: a famous good-looking Irish writer, a difficult person who suffers from writer’s block. He is in love with Laura.

Eleanora Huckleby: Dermot’s headstrong and free-spoken agent.

Grant: Laura’s friend and colleague at the bookshop.

Henry Barnsley: Laura’s friend and boss, the owner of the bookshop.

Monica Playfair: Laura’s musician friend.

Seamus: Monica’s musician boyfriend.

Fenella Gainsborough: Eleanora’s niece, the organizer of the festival.

Rupert Gainsborough: Fenella’s husband.

Marion: the owner of a house in Ireland where Laura and Monica stay.

Sarah Stradford: one of the organizer of the festival.

Reception
Kirkus Reviews gave the book a mixed review, stating "despite occasional flashes of wit, a standard romance tale with a predictable outcome." Publishers Weekly similarly described it as a " cute but meandering story", concluding that it is "comfortable if predictable".

References

External links
- Katie Fforde's Official Website

2009 British novels
British young adult novels
Arrow Books books